Mammood is a small village in Kottayam district of Kerala state in India. Mammood falls under Madapally Panchayat and Chanaganacherry Thaluk. The village is situated about 10 km away from Changanacherry town. Changanacherry-Vazhoor Road passes through this village. Around 20,000 people lives here. The greenish landscape includes rubber plantations, paddy fields, coconut trees, pepper, mango trees, coca, and a wide variety of plants and trees.

Recreation Center 
Forward Social Club & Reading Room, Mammood.

Transportation
Railway Station: Changanassery, 9 km away from Mammood

Post Office: Mammood

Schools
School : St. Shantals School, St Sebastian School,
C. M. S. L. P. S. Mammood, Established on 1847, S. A. L. P. S. Mammood.

Mother theresa public school mammood

Nearest Towns/Villages 
Thengana
Thottakadu
Changanacherry
Perumpanachy
Karukachal
Vakathanam
Kurumpanadam
Thrikkodithanam

Nearest Small Towns/Villages 
Kochu Road
Palamattom
Nadakkappadom
Mannila
Santhipuram
 Madappally
 Venkotta
 Daivampady
 Chennamattom
 Chennamattom

Transportation 

 Taxis/Autos
 Local Bus services from Changanassery (Private Bus Stand) and KSRTC (Changanassery) from all the above-mentioned nearest towns/villages
 Nearest Railway station is Changanacherry, about 10 km away or Tiruvalla about 14 km away.

Famous Personalities 
Johny Antony cinema director

References 

 http://lourdesmathachurchmammood.in/
 Madappally Grama Panchayat
 Madappally Bolck Panchayat

Villages in Kottayam district